C.L. and Bessie G. McGhee House is a historic home located at 103 West Mason Street in Franklinton, Franklin County, North Carolina.  It was built in 1911, and is a -story, three bay, blended Colonial Revival / Bungalow style frame dwelling.  The house has a steeply pitched hipped roof and stands on a full brick foundation.  It features a one-story hip-roof wraparound porch and the interior has original wallpaper by M. H. Birge Company of Buffalo, New York.  Also on the property is a contributing outbuilding (c. 1920).

It was listed on the National Register of Historic Places in 2007.

References

Houses on the National Register of Historic Places in North Carolina
Colonial Revival architecture in North Carolina
Houses completed in 1911
Houses in Franklin County, North Carolina
National Register of Historic Places in Franklin County, North Carolina